Zig Zag railway station is a railway station located on the New South Wales Main Western Line. It was originally built in April 1878 and closed in 1910 due to the opening of the Ten Tunnels Deviation which bypassed the original site of the station. The station was not rebuilt until 1959 when a new station was built alongside the 1910 alignment in a similar location to the 1878 station.

The station is an interchange with Zig Zag railway's Bottom Points station and depot, serving as the primary access point.

The station was closed temporarily from December 2019 to May 2020 due to major bushfire damage sustained in the 2019-2020 bushfires.

Platforms & services
Zig Zag has two side platforms, sized at 7 m each. It is serviced by NSW TrainLink Blue Mountains Line services travelling from Sydney Central to Lithgow. It is a request stop with passengers required to notify the guard if they wish to alight and signal the driver if they want to board.

|p3linename       = Blue Mountains Line
|p3stop           = services to Sydney Central
|p3notes          = request stop
|p4linename       = Blue Mountains Line
|p4stop           = services to Lithgow 
|p4notes          = request stop}}
|p5linename       = Blue Mountains Line
|p5stop           = services to Sydney Central
|p5notes          = request stop
|p6linename       = Blue Mountains Line
|p6stop           = services to Lithgow 
|p6notes          = request stop}}

References

External links
Zig Zag station details Transport for New South Wales

Railway stations in Australia opened in 1878
Regional railway stations in New South Wales
Short-platform railway stations in New South Wales, 1 car or less
Main Western railway line, New South Wales